Agam Puram  ( Two-sided)  is a 2010 Indian Tamil language action film written and directed by Thirumalai. The long-delayed film started production in early 2008 and film features Shaam and Meenakshi in the lead roles with Raja and Anandaraj. It released on 10 December 2010.

Plot
Thiru (Shaam) who was raised by Martin Fernandes (Raja) grows up to be his foster father's right hand. Soon, the aging Fernandez passes away, leaving his assets to Thiru who 
then takes up the reins of the former's drug business. But his strict working style irks his partners who turn against him. Gradually, he realizes the consequences of his illegal business  on his family and friends. How he handles his dilemma forms the crux of the story.

Cast

Production
Agam Puram began production at the end of January 2008 with Keerath playing the female lead opposite Shaam with M. Gopalakrishnan financing the film. Meenakshi was later cast as the lead actress and worked on this film after Karuppusamy Kuththagaithaarar (2007). She played an orphan in the film. The film was titled Agam Puram due to the director's passions for literature and also due to the fact that "Agam Puram" means "two-sided", which relates to Shaam's double sided character. Shaam became the film's producer in 2010 after M. Gopalakrishnan left the film. However, Thirumalai, the film's director, produced the film under his banner T. Creations. Shaam worked out to prepare for his role as a gangster. The film was shot in Malaysia and Spain. Newcomer Megha Khan was cast in the film.

Soundtrack 
The soundtrack was composed by Sundar C. Babu. The song "Onu Mani Rendu Mani" is a folk song.

"Orea Oru Ooru" - Shankar Mahadevan
"Oru Mani Rendu Mani" - P. P. Venkat
"Kangalai Parithidum" - Karthik, Ranjini Josh
"Kangal Modhi" - Naresh Iyer, Vichitra
"Kattil Mel Adithadia" - Ranjith, Sayanora Philip
"Agam Puram" Theme Music - Sundar C Babu

Release 
A critic from The New Indian Express wrote that "But most of the information we collect, are from dialogues, the characters barely flushed out in the screenplay. The scenes lack depth and intensity, the narration is flat and bland, without any highs or lows". A critic from The Hindu wrote that "Director Thirumalai, it's obvious, wisheds to present a story with unexpected twists. Only that the attempt misfires and he ends up with a product that lacks cohesion". A critic from Dinamalar praised the performance of the lead cast and the story.

Legacy 
Shaam was cast as a cop in Kick (2009) after Surender Reddy saw his stills from this film. The success of Kick meant that this film was dubbed in Telugu and released as Gang War in 2011. He also was set to collaborate with Thirumalai again for Dhoosi; however, the project did not materialise.

References

External links
 

2010 films
2010 action films
2010s Tamil-language films
Films scored by Sundar C. Babu
Indian action films